Nguyễn Tuấn Anh (born 16 May 1995) is a Vietnamese professional footballer who plays as a central midfielder for Hoàng Anh Gia Lai and the Vietnam national team.

Tuấn Anh is considered one of the most talented and technically gifted midfielders of Vietnam. He is a product of HAGL – Arsenal JMG Academy and was promoted to Hoàng Anh Gia Lai's first team in 2015. Tuấn Anh has represented the Vietnam national team at U-19 and U-23 level. He was voted as young player of the year in 2014.

Early life
Tuấn Anh was born on 16 May 1995 in Mai Trang, An Quý, Quỳnh Phụ District, Thái Bình Province to Nguyễn Văn Dung, a doctor, and Nguyễn Thị Loan. He's the second child in a family of two siblings, he has an older sister named Quỳnh Mai. His father, Nguyễn Văn Dung is the deputy director of Phụ Dục general hospital in Quỳnh Phụ, Thái Bình, he wanted his son to become a doctor but Tuấn Anh expressed that he love football more than anything. Tuan Anh's family was later persuaded by his enthusiasm for football and allowed him to follow his dream.

Tuấn Anh was a part of Thái Bình Province U-11 football team that won the second place in 2004 national youth football tournament in Khánh Hòa Province when he was nine. His performance caught the attention of staffs from Thái Bình Province's football talent school and he was offered a place at the school. After seven months of living there, his parents withdrew him from the school due to their concern about living standard there even though the school highly rated Tuấn Anh and really wanted to keep him.

Club career

HAGL - Arsenal JMG Academy
In 2007, Tuấn Anh passed the try-out for HAGL – Arsenal JMG Academy, he was one of only fourteen players that got accepted into the academy out of about seven thousand candidates from all over the country in the first selection.

In June 2010, Tuấn Anh and Nguyễn Công Phượng were the only two players from HAGL JMG Academy that were invited to a fifteen days oversea training program in Mali, It was a training program for top players of JMG Academy from all over the globe. Tuấn Anh was praised and highly rated by the academy's director Jean-Marc Guillou during the training program.

In November 2012, Tuấn Anh along with Nguyễn Công Phượng, Lương Xuân Trường, Trần Hữu Đông Triều were four of the players from the academy received the invitation to train with Arsenal F.C. U-17 team. In the letter, Arsenal's performance supervisor, Steve Morrow stated that coach Arsène Wenger was impressed with the academy's players when they beat Arsenal U-17 team in January. After the training end, Tuấn Anh was the player impressed coach Arsène Wenger the most, he even introduced Tuấn Anh to a Greeks football club for a trial. Unfortunately Tuấn Anh missed the trial opportunity as he suffered from a serious ligament injury in early 2012 that took him six month to recover. He was sent to a hospital in Paris that specialize in treating injures for sport athlete for the knee operation.

Tuấn Anh was voted as player of the tournament at 2014 International U-21 Thanh Niên Newspaper Cup where HAGL – Arsenal JMG Academy team was crowned as the champion after defeated Thailand U-21 (3-0) in the final.

Hoàng Anh Gia Lai
Tuấn Anh was promoted to Hoàng Anh Gia Lai F.C. first team along with other academy's player from the first selection in 2015 when the club revolutionized their first team, most of their first team players were released, only a few was kept to guide young player from the academy. Tuấn Anh was promoted to first team along with other academy's player from the first selection.

Tuấn Anh made his V.League 1 debut on 4 January 2015 at the opening game of the season against Sanna Khanh Hoa F.C. He score his first league goal in this game as Hoàng Anh Gia Lai F.C. won the game 4–2. On 14 April, Tuấn Anh won the 2014 young player of the year award with 49 votes, 10 votes more than his club mate Công Phượng at second place. Tuấn Anh was also voted as the team's best player at the end of the season, he has the most appearances in the team, played in all 26 league games of the season including 25 starts.

Yokohama FC (loan)
Tuấn Anh joined Yokohama FC in December 2015 in a season-long loan. Tuấn Anh had an impressive game for the club against Nagano Parceiro in the emperor's cup, where he won a penalty for his team and scored the winning goal in a 3-2 win.

Career statistics

National team

International career

Vietnam under-19
Tuấn Anh first played for Vietnam U-19 team at 2013 AFF U-19 Youth Championship. He captained his team in the final as they lost to the host Indonesia U-19 in the penalty shoot-out. Tuấn Anh was voted as the player of the tournament.

Throughout 2013 to 2014, Tuấn Anh was an important part of the U-19 team he played in all of their competitions such as: 2014 AFC U-19 Championship qualification where his team came out as Group F winner after they shockingly beat Australia U-19 (5-1), 2014 AFF U-19 Youth Championship where they finished second, and 2014 AFC U-19 Championship.

Vietnam under-23
Tuấn Anh was called to the Vietnam U-23 team in March 2015 to play in 2016 AFC U-23 Championship qualification. He played at the opening game in which his team beat host Malaysia U-23 (2-1) before missed out the last match again Macau U-23 due to injury.
After the Vietnam U-23 team qualified, he played in the 2016 AFC U-23 Championship and scored one goal against UAE-U-23.

International goals

U-19

Scores and results list Vietnam's goal tally first.

U-22

Scores and results list Vietnam's goal tally first.

Vietnam

Scores and results list Vietnam's goal tally first.

Honours
Vietnam 
VFF Cup: 2022
King's Cup: Runner-up: 2019
AFF Championship runners-up: 2022
Vietnam U19
AFF U-19 Youth Championship: Runner-up: 2013, 2014
Hassanal Bolkiah Trophy: Runner-up: 2014

References

External links
 
 

1995 births
Living people
Vietnamese footballers
Association football midfielders
V.League 1 players
Vietnam international footballers
Hoang Anh Gia Lai FC players
Vietnamese expatriate footballers
Vietnamese expatriate sportspeople in Japan
Expatriate footballers in Japan
J2 League players
Yokohama FC players
People from Thái Bình province
Competitors at the 2017 Southeast Asian Games
Southeast Asian Games competitors for Vietnam